The Mummy Strikes (1943) is the fourteenth of seventeen animated Technicolor short films based upon the DC Comics character of Superman. Produced by Famous Studios, the cartoon was originally released to theaters by Paramount Pictures on February 19, 1943.

Plot

At the Metropolis museum, a local Egyptologist, Dr. Jordan, is found murdered. His assistant, Ms. Jane Hogan finds his dead body in front of the sarcophagus of King Tush. She finds a syringe near the doctor's body. With no other evidence to go on, the police assume that Ms. Hogan is the killer. She admits that her fingerprints are on the syringe, and she is convicted for the murder.

A few days later, Clark Kent gets a call from a professor at the museum, asking him to come to the museum and listen to another theory on the death of Dr. Jordan. Clark sneaks out, claiming it is his Doctor, but out of curiosity, Lois follows. At the museum, the professor explains to Clark how he believes that Dr. Jordan was actually killed by a mummy's curse. He takes Clark through the Egypt exhibit at the museum and tells him the story of King Tush (King Tush's story is similar to the story of King Tut). Lois follows them, making sure not to be seen.

Before his death, the 12-year-old Tush's father, the old pharaoh who ruled the North and warred against the South, commanded his giant, superhuman guards to swear an oath to protect his son throughout eternity. After his death, Tush became the pharaoh. Shortly after that, King Tush became ill, already being young and sickly, and eventually died. Keeping their promise to the old pharaoh, the guards committed suicide by drinking poison in order to protect King Tush in the afterlife.

The professor then shows Clark the catacombs which Dr. Jordan recreated in the image of how it looked inside the pyramids. He then reveals that Dr. Jordan had recreated an ancient formula called the Fluid of Life, which he injected into the giant guard's mummified bodies, hoping they would return to life, but seemingly failed. As they approach King Tush's sarcophagus, the professor explains that Dr. Jordan invoked the curse by trying to open the king's sarcophagus. Clark pushes a button on the side of the sarcophagus and just misses being pricked by a poisoned syringe that shoots out at him. This new evidence seems enough to clear Ms. Hogan of the murder charges.

Sensing that the needle missed, the sarcophagus opens and a light from the dead king's jeweled amulet awakens his giant guards. The guards attack Clark, Lois and the professor. Clark is thrown into a sarcophagus, where he quickly changes into Superman. As Superman, he defeats the giant guards and saves Lois and the professor from a grim demise by fire.

Back at the Daily Planet, Clark smiles as he finishes his report on Ms. Hogan being released from jail. Lois is sitting on the desk. She was injured in the mummy attack and her hands had to be bandaged up (therefore, she wasn't able to write the story herself). She grumbles as Clark finishes his story. When Clark asks how she knew to be there, she replies, "My mummy done told me".

Voice cast
 Joan Alexander as Lois Lane, Jane Hogan (uncredited)
 Jackson Beck as Dr. Wilson, Narrator (uncredited)
 Bud Collyer as Clark Kent / Superman (most lines - uncredited)
 Sam Parker as Clark Kent (last lines - uncredited)

References

External links
 
 The Mummy Strikes at the Internet Archive
 

1943 films
1943 animated films
1940s American animated films
1940s animated short films
1940s animated superhero films
Superman animated shorts
Films directed by Isadore Sparber
Paramount Pictures short films
Mummy films
1940s English-language films